New Bridge Thonglor Football Club (Thai : สโมสรฟุตบอล นิวบริดจ์ ทองหล่อ), is a Thai football club based in Bangkok, Thailand. The club is currently playing in the Thai Football Division 3.

Record

References
 104 ทีมร่วมชิงชัย! แบโผผลจับสลาก ดิวิชั่น 3 ฤดูกาล 2016

External links
 Facebookpage

Association football clubs established in 2016
Football clubs in Bangkok
Sport in Bangkok
2016 establishments in Thailand